Vadim Mikhaylovich Yemelyanov  (25 April 1942 – 27 May 1977) was a Soviet heavyweight boxer who won a bronze medal at the 1964 Olympics.

Yemelyanov took up boxing while serving in the Soviet Navy in Leningrad Oblast. He never held a national title, placing second-third in 1961, 1965 and 1967, but was successful internationally, winning the European Cup and the World Army Championships in 1963. At the 1964 Olympics he lost in a semifinal to the eventual winner Joe Frazier. During his career Yemelyanov won 141 of his 158 bouts. He was a career naval officer and worked as a boxing coach in Severomorsk, where he died in an accident aged 35. Since 1985 an annual boxing tournament has been held there in his honor.

1964 Olympic results
Below are the results of Vadim Yemelyanov, a heavyweight boxer who competed for the Soviet Union at the 1964 Olympics in Tokyo.

 Round of 16: defeated Wladyslaw Jedrzejewski (Poland) referee stopped contest
 Quarterfinal: defeated Santiago Lovell (Argentina) by knockout
 Semifinal: lost to Joe Frazier (United States) referee stopped contest (was awarded bronze medal)

References 

1942 births
Soviet male boxers
Olympic boxers of the Soviet Union
Olympic bronze medalists for the Soviet Union
Boxers at the 1964 Summer Olympics
1977 deaths
Olympic medalists in boxing
Russian male boxers
Medalists at the 1964 Summer Olympics
Heavyweight boxers
People from Krasnodar Krai
Sportspeople from Krasnodar Krai